The 1997 NASCAR Busch Series began February 15 and ended November 9. Randy LaJoie of BACE Motorsports won the championship.

Teams and drivers

Complete schedule
List of full-time teams at the start of 1997.

Part-time schedule

Races

Gargoyles 300 

The Gargoyles 300 was held on February 15 at Daytona International Speedway. Elliott Sadler won the pole.

Top ten results

74-Randy LaJoie
36-Todd Bodine
21-Michael Waltrip
87-Joe Nemechek
63-Tracy Leslie
45-Greg Sacks
3-Steve Park
37-Mark Green
4-Jeff Purvis
10-Phil Parsons

Goodwrench Service 200 

The Goodwrench Service 200  was held on February 22 at North Carolina Speedway. Mark Martin won the pole.

Top ten results

60-Mark Martin
32-Dale Jarrett
74-Randy LaJoie
10-Phil Parsons
29-Elliott Sadler
2-Ricky Craven
36-Todd Bodine
34-Mike McLaughlin
99-Glenn Allen Jr.
33-Tim Fedewa

Hardee's Fried Chicken 250 

The Hardee's Fried Chicken 250 was held on March 1 at Richmond International Raceway. Randy LaJoie won the pole.

Top ten results

60-Mark Martin
8-Jeff Green
3-Steve Park
10-Phil Parsons
57-Jason Keller
9-Jeff Burton
36-Todd Bodine
74-Randy LaJoie
94-Ron Barfield
44-Bobby Labonte

Stihl Outdoor Power Tools 300 

The Stihl Outdoor Power Tools 300 was held on March 8 at Atlanta Motor Speedway. Tim Bender won the pole.

Top ten results

60-Mark Martin
38-Elton Sawyer
44-Bobby Labonte
00-Buckshot Jones
87-Joe Nemechek
36-Todd Bodine
33-Tim Fedewa
10-Phil Parsons
29-Elliott Sadler
5-Terry Labonte

Las Vegas 300 

The inaugural Las Vegas 300 was held on March 16 at Las Vegas Motor Speedway. Jeff Green won the pole.

Top ten results

8-Jeff Green
64-Dick Trickle
36-Todd Bodine
21-Michael Waltrip
4-Tim Steele
45-Greg Sacks
10-Phil Parsons
3-Steve Park
99-Glenn Allen Jr.
72-Mike Dillon

Diamond Hill Plywood 200 

The Diamond Hill Plywood 200 was held on March 22 at Darlington Raceway. Elliott Sadler won the pole.

Top ten results

74-Randy LaJoie
9-Jeff Burton
64-Dick Trickle
60-Mark Martin
10-Phil Parsons
00-Buckshot Jones
47-Jeff Fuller
8-Jeff Green
63-Tracy Leslie
36-Todd Bodine

Galaxy Foods 300 

The Galaxy Foods 300 was held on March 29 at Hickory Motor Speedway. Todd Bodine won the pole.

Top ten results

64-Dick Trickle
74-Randy LaJoie
33-Tim Fedewa
8-Jeff Green
36-Todd Bodine
38-Elton Sawyer
57-Jason Keller
39-Elliott Sadler
37-Mark Green
34-Mike McLaughlin

Coca-Cola 300 

The inaugural Coca-Cola 300 was held on April 5 at Texas Motor Speedway.

60-Mark Martin
20-Jimmy Spencer
9-Jeff Burton
36-Todd Bodine
34-Mike McLaughlin
10-Phil Parsons
00-Buckshot Jones
88-Kevin Lepage
74-Randy LaJoie
63-Tracy Leslie

Moore's Snacks 250 

The Moore's Snacks 250 was held on April 12 at Bristol Motor Speedway. Hermie Sadler won the pole.

Top ten results

9-Jeff Burton
34-Mike McLaughlin
74-Randy LaJoie
21-Michael Waltrip
64-Dick Trickle
3-Steve Park
33-Tim Fedewa
10-Phil Parsons
57-Jason Keller
00-Buckshot Jones

BellSouth Mobility/Opryland 320 

The BellSouth Mobility/Opryland 320 was held on April 19 at Nashville Speedway USA. Mike McLaughlin won the pole.

Top ten results

3-Steve Park
8-Jeff Green
33-Tim Fedewa
28-Jeff Purvis
36-Todd Bodine
74-Randy LaJoie
1-Hermie Sadler
88-Kevin Lepage
43-Dennis Setzer
00-Buckshot Jones

Birmingham Auto Dealers 500K 

The Birmingham Auto Dealers 500K was held on April 26 at Talladega Superspeedway. Joe Nemechek won the pole.

Top ten results

60-Mark Martin
3-Steve Park
8-Jeff Green
49-Kyle Petty
33-Tim Fedewa
4-Tim Steele
17-Matt Kenseth
36-Todd Bodine
94-Ron Barfield
64-Dick Trickle

United States Cellular 200 

The United States Cellular 200 was held on May 10 at New Hampshire International Speedway. Randy LaJoie won the pole.

Top ten results

34-Mike McLaughlin
3-Steve Park
47-Jeff Fuller
38-Elton Sawyer
10-Phil Parsons
36-Todd Bodine
74-Randy LaJoie
80-Mark Krogh
76-Tom Bolles
4-Dale Shaw

Core States Advantage 200 

The Core States Advantage 200 was held on May 18 at Nazareth Speedway. Elliott Sadler won the pole.

Top ten results

29-Elliott Sadler
36-Todd Bodine
74-Randy LaJoie
8-Jeff Green
4-Dale Shaw
6-Joe Bessey
57-Jason Keller
34-Mike McLaughlin
00-Buckshot Jones
43-Dennis Setzer

Carquest Auto Parts 300 

The Carquest Auto Parts 300 was held on May 24 at Charlotte Motor Speedway. Mark Martin won the pole.

Top ten results

87-Joe Nemechek
88-Kevin Lepage
60-Mark Martin
20-Jimmy Spencer
10-Phil Parsons
00-Buckshot Jones
34-Todd Bodine
57-Jason Keller
1-Hermie Sadler
74-Randy LaJoie

GM Goodwrench/Delco Batteries 200 

The GM Goodwrench/Delco Batteries 200 was held on May 31 at Dover International Speedway. Dick Trickle won the pole.

Top ten results

44-Bobby Labonte
9-Jeff Burton
74-Randy LaJoie
88-Kevin Lepage
3-Steve Park
32-Dale Jarrett
36-Todd Bodine
5-Terry Labonte
38-Elton Sawyer
21-Michael Waltrip

Winston Motorsports 300 

The Winston Motorsports 300 was held on June 13 at South Boston Speedway. Shane Hall won the pole.

Top ten results

74-Randy LaJoie
4-Dale Shaw
00-Buckshot Jones
88-Kevin Lepage
38-Elton Sawyer
17-Matt Kenseth
57-Jason Keller
34-Mike McLaughlin
36-Todd Bodine
6-Joe Bessey

Lysol 200 

The Lysol 200 was held on June 29 at Watkins Glen International. Joe Nemechek won the pole.

Top ten results

34-Mike McLaughlin
36-Todd Bodine
87-Joe Nemechek
20-Jimmy Spencer
5-Terry Labonte
3-Steve Park
44-Bobby Labonte
32-Dale Jarrett
1-Hermie Sadler
85-Shane Hall

Sears Auto Center 250 

The Sears Auto Center 250 was held on July 6 at The Milwaukee Mile. Tim Fedewa won the pole.

Top ten results

74-Randy LaJoie
29-Elliott Sadler
1-Hermie Sadler
00-Buckshot Jones
3-Steve Park
38-Elton Sawyer
10-Phil Parsons
4-Dale Shaw
63-Tracy Leslie
33-Tim Fedewa

Advance Auto Parts 250 

The Advance Auto Parts 250 was held on July 12 at Myrtle Beach Speedway. Elliott Sadler won the pole.

Top ten results

29-Elliott Sadler
34-Mike McLaughlin
74-Randy LaJoie
36-Todd Bodine
38-Elton Sawyer
72-Mike Dillon
99-Glenn Allen Jr.
28-Jeff Purvis
3-Steve Park
00-Buckshot Jones

Gateway 300 

The Gateway 300 was held on July 26 at Gateway International Raceway. Joe Bessey won the pole.

Top ten results

29-Elliott Sadler
57-Jason Keller
4-Dale Shaw
38-Elton Sawyer
34-Mike McLaughlin
33-Tim Fedewa
45-Jeff Fuller
37-Mark Green
6-Joe Bessey
43-Dennis Setzer

Kroger 200 presented by Ziploc 

The Kroger 200 presented by Ziploc was held on August 1 at Indianapolis Raceway Park. Randy LaJoie won the pole.

Top ten results

74-Randy LaJoie
29-Elliott Sadler
38-Elton Sawyer
33-Tim Fedewa
83-Wayne Grubb
17-Matt Kenseth
00-Buckshot Jones
3-Steve Park
56-Jeff Krogh
57-Jason Keller

Detroit Gasket 200 

The Detroit Gasket 200 was held on August 16 at Michigan International Speedway. Hermie Sadler won the pole.

Top ten results

3-Steve Park
20-Jimmy Spencer
44-Bobby Labonte
9-Jeff Burton
00-Buckshot Jones
36-Todd Bodine
31-Dale Earnhardt Jr.
17-Matt Kenseth
10-Phil Parsons
4-Dale Shaw

Failed to qualify: Mark Day (#16), Lyndon Amick (#35), Greg Sacks (#50), Nathan Buttke (#78), Ron Barfield (#94), Doug Reid III (#97)

Food City 250 

The Food City 250 was held on August 22 at Bristol Motor Speedway. Randy LaJoie won the pole. Buckshot Jones, who finished 26th, received a 50-point penalty after intentionally trying to wreck Randy LaJoie.

Top ten results

20-Jimmy Spencer
3-Steve Park
47-Robert Pressley
74-Randy LaJoie
75-Rick Wilson
44-Bobby Labonte
96-Stevie Reeves
36-Todd Bodine
45-Jeff Fuller
88-Kevin Lepage

Dura Lube 200 presented by Trak Automotive 

The Dura Lube 200 presented by Trak Automotive was held on August 30 at Darlington Raceway. Mark Martin won the pole. This was the first race run at the racetrack after the start-finish line was moved to the back straightaway.

Top ten results

9-Jeff Burton
34-Mike McLaughlin
64-Dick Trickle
44-Bobby Labonte
3-Steve Park
60-Mark Martin
1-Hermie Sadler
36-Todd Bodine
29-Elliott Sadler
2-Ricky Craven

Autolite Platinum 250 

The Autolite Platinum 250 was held on September 5 at Richmond International Raceway. Michael Waltrip won the pole.

Top ten results

3-Steve Park
74-Randy LaJoie
9-Jeff Burton
64-Dick Trickle
00-Buckshot Jones
4-Dale Shaw
57-Jason Keller
60-Mark Martin
33-Tim Fedewa
1-Hermie Sadler

MBNA 200 

The MBNA 200 was held on September 20 at Dover International Speedway. Dick Trickle won the pole.

Top ten results

6-Joe Bessey
74-Randy LaJoie
17-Matt Kenseth
72-Mike Dillon
3-Steve Park
29-Elliott Sadler
63-Tracy Leslie
99-Glenn Allen Jr.
5-Terry Labonte
34-Mike McLaughlin

This would be the first and only win of Bessey's career.

All Pro Bumper to Bumper 300 

The All Pro Bumper to Bumper 300 was held on October 4 at Charlotte Motor Speedway. Joe Nemechek won the pole.

Top ten results

20-Jimmy Spencer
60-Mark Martin
44-Tony Stewart
9-Jeff Burton
37-Mark Green
3-Steve Park
32-Dale Jarrett
87-Joe Nemechek
18-Bobby Labonte
00-Buckshot Jones

Kenwood Home & Car Audio 300 

The inaugural Kenwood Home & Car Audio 300 was held on October 19 at California Speedway. Steve Park won the pole.

Top ten results

36-Todd Bodine
3-Steve Park
17-Matt Kenseth
21-Michael Waltrip
47-Robert Pressley
72-Mike Dillon
99-Glenn Allen Jr.
43-Dennis Setzer
34-Mike McLaughlin
74-Randy LaJoie

AC Delco 200 

The AC Delco 200 was held on October 25 at North Carolina Speedway. Jeff Burton won the pole.

Top ten results

60-Mark Martin
64-Dick Trickle
2-Ricky Craven
9-Jeff Burton
1-Hermie Sadler
3-Steve Park
34-Mike McLaughlin
37-Mark Green
44-Tony Stewart
47-Robert Pressley

Jiffy Lube Miami 300 

The Jiffy Lube Miami 300 was held on November 9 at Homestead-Miami Speedway. Mike McLaughlin won the pole.

Top ten results

87-Joe Nemechek
74-Randy LaJoie
60-Mark Martin
99-Glenn Allen Jr.
20-Jimmy Spencer
17-Matt Kenseth
36-Todd Bodine
88-Kevin Schwantz
6-Joe Bessey
33-Tim Fedewa

This was a very emotional win for Nemechek, as his brother lost his life at HMS just 8 months earlier.

Final points standings 

Randy LaJoie - 4381
Todd Bodine - 4115
Steve Park -  4080
Mike McLaughlin - 3614
Elliott Sadler - 3534
Phil Parsons - 3523
Buckshot Jones - 3437
Elton Sawyer - 3419
Tim Fedewa - 3398
Hermie Sadler - 3340
Mark Green - 3261
Kevin Lepage - 3248
Jason Keller - 3242
Dick Trickle - 3074
Mike Dillon - 3008
Glenn Allen Jr. - 2969
Tracy Leslie - 2880
Joe Bessey -  2835
Dennis Setzer - 2541
Stevie Reeves - 2528
Jeff Fuller - 2515
Matt Kenseth - 2426
Shane Hall - 2285
Mark Martin - 2104
Johnny Chapman - 2016
Jeff Burton - 1948
Bobby Labonte - 1912
Jeff Green - 1898
Michael Waltrip - 1738
Jimmy Spencer - 1576
Mark Krogh - 1481
Robert Pressley - 1465
Terry Labonte - 1455
Greg Sacks - 1420
Jeff Krogh - 1416
Dale Jarrett - 1364
Ron Barfield - 1362
Randy Porter - 1320
Dale Shaw - 1258
Joe Nemechek - 1162
Nathan Buttke - 1135 
Lyndon Amick - 1110
Ricky Craven - 1063
Jeff Purvis - 972
Rodney Combs - 743
Tim Steele - 736 
Dale Earnhardt Jr. - 684
Ed Berrier - 655
Tim Bender - 620
Rick Wilson - 617

Full Drivers' Championship

(key) Bold – Pole position awarded by time. Italics – Pole position set by owner's points. * – Most laps led.

 Jason Keller made an illegal driver change before the start of the race and thus was not awarded any points or money.

Rookie of the Year 
Steve Park was the only rookie candidate to compete full-time in 1997, picking up three wins and finishing 3rd in points. Matt Kenseth was the top runner-up, despite replacing fellow candidate Tim Bender several races into the season. Johnny Chapman began the year with NorthStar Motorsports, but was released with several races to go in the season. Brothers Jeff and Mark Krogh came in from the Northwest driving for their family-owned team, each posting one top-ten apiece. Lyndon Amick and Dale Earnhardt Jr. were the only other rookie contenders in 1997.

See also 
 1997 NASCAR Winston Cup Series
 1997 NASCAR Craftsman Truck Series

External links 
Busch Series standings and statistics for 1997

NASCAR Xfinity Series seasons